Andreas Kittou (born 9 September 1990 in Paralimni) is a Cypriot football goalkeeper who plays for Ayia Napa.

Club statistics

References

External links
 Cyprus Football Association Profile
 

1990 births
Living people
Cypriot footballers
Enosis Neon Paralimni FC players
Ayia Napa FC players
Anorthosis Famagusta F.C. players
AEL Limassol players
Cypriot First Division players
Association football goalkeepers